The 1906 Brown Bears football team represented Brown University as an independent during the 1906 college football season. Led by seventh-year head coach Edward N. Robinson, Brown compiled a record of 6–3.

Schedule

References

Brown
Brown Bears football seasons
Brown Bears football